Manuel San Germán was a Spanish actor.  He appeared in seventeen films during his career, including the 1926 silent film Malvaloca.

Selected filmography
 Malvaloca (1926)
 Agustina of Aragon (1929)

References

Bibliography 
 Goble, Alan. The Complete Index to Literary Sources in Film. Walter de Gruyter, 1999.

External links 
 

Year of birth unknown
Year of death unknown
Spanish male film actors
Spanish male silent film actors